The Bank of England £100,000,000 note, also referred to as Titan, is a non-circulating Bank of England sterling banknote used to back the value of Scottish and Northern Irish banknotes. It is the highest denomination of banknote printed by the Bank of England. As both of these regions have their own currency issued by particular local banks, the non-circulating notes provide the essential link between those currencies and that of England, and security if a local issuing bank were to fail.

Purpose 
The £100,000,000 note (nicknamed "Titan" simply because of its titanic value) backs the value of common circulating notes (£1, £5, £10, £20, £50, and £100 notes) issued by the seven commercial banks in Scotland (Bank of Scotland, Royal Bank of Scotland, Clydesdale Bank) and Northern Ireland (Bank of Ireland, Danske Bank and Ulster Bank). The £1,000,000 note plays a similar vital role in the British currency system. Scottish and Northern Irish banknotes are often viewed with suspicion by businesses in England and Wales as businesses are not always overly familiar with all the different types of notes that are issued and may not be sure on how to check them for counterfeiting and, therefore, do not like to accept them. There is also the possibility of one of the commercial banks closing; all banknotes issued by a closed commercial bank would be considered worthless. The backing by the £100,000,000 notes and the £1,000,000 notes is intended to maintain public confidence in the value the notes represent. For every pound an authorised Scottish or Northern Irish commercial bank prints and issues in the form of its own notes, it must deposit the equivalent in pound sterling with the Bank of England. If necessary, notes from a struggling Scottish or Northern Irish commercial bank could be replaced with regular Bank of England issued cash.

The Bank of England prints £100,000,000 notes internally, rather than at its normal commercial printers, for security reasons. The £100,000,000 notes are then locked away together with other backing assets either within the Bank of England vault, or in other authorised locations, to further ensure their security as physical assets. For even further security, £100,000,000 notes must be signed by the existing Chief Cashier in order to become legal tender and actually be used as a backing asset for commercial banks and their notes in Scotland and Northern Ireland.

See also 

 Bank of England £1,000,000 note
 Bank of England note issues
 Gold certificate

Notes

References

Citations

External links 
 Bank of England website
 'Titan' note, held in the BoE vaults, worth £100 million

Banknotes of England